

Baden-Württemberg
 bodo Bodensee-Oberschwaben Verkehrsverbund
 DING Donau-Iller-Nahverkehrsverbund (reaches into Bavaria)
 HNV Heilbronner Hohenloher Haller Nahverkehr
 HTV Heidenheimer Tarifverbund
 KVS KreisVerkehr Schwäbisch Hall
 KVV Karlsruher Verkehrsverbund (reaches into Rhineland-Palatinate)
 naldo Verkehrsverbund Neckar-Alb-Donau
 RVF Regio-Verkehrsverbund Freiburg
 RVL Regio Verkehrsverbund Lörrach
 TGO Tarifverbund Ortenau Home page
 TUTicket Verkehrsverbund Tuttlingen
 VGC Verkehrsgesellschaft Bäderkreis Calw
 VGF Verkehrs-Gemeinschaft Landkreis Freudenstadt
 VGS Verkehrsgemeinschaft Stauferkreis Home page
 VHB Verkehrsverbund Hegau-Bodensee
 VPE Verkehrsverbund Pforzheim-Enzkreis
 VRN Verkehrsverbund Rhein-Neckar (reaches into Hesse, Rhineland-Palatinate and France)
 VSB Verkehrsverbund Schwarzwald-Baar
 VVR Verkehrsverbund Rottweil Home page
 VVS Verkehrs- und Tarifverbund Stuttgart
 WTV Waldshuter Tarifverbund

Bavaria

 AVV Augsburger Verkehrs- und Tarifverbund
 DING Donau-Iller-Nahverkehrsverbund (reaches into Baden-Württemberg)
 MVV Münchner Verkehrs- und Tarifverbund
 RVV Regensburger Verkehrsverbund
 SVV Salzburger Verkehrsverbund (reaches from Austria)
 VAB Verkehrsgemeinschaft am Bayerischen Untermain Home page
 VGN Verkehrsverbund Großraum Nürnberg
 VGRI Verkehrsgemeinschaft Rottal-Inn Home page
 VLC Verkehrsgemeinschaft Landkreis Cham
 VLP Verkehrsgemeinschaft Landkreis PassauHome page
 VVM Verkehrsverbund Mainfranken

Berlin
 VBB Verkehrsverbund Berlin-Brandenburg (reaches into Brandenburg)

Brandenburg
 VBB Verkehrsverbund Berlin-Brandenburg (reaches into Berlin)

Bremen
 VBN Verkehrsverbund Bremen-Niedersachsen (reaches into Lower Saxony)

Hamburg
 HVV Hamburger Verkehrsverbund (reaches into Lower Saxony and Schleswig-Holstein)

Hesse
 NVV Nordhessischer Verkehrsverbund
 RMV Rhein-Main-Verkehrsverbund (reaches into Rhineland-Palatinate)
 RNN Rhein-Nahe-Nahverkehrsverbund (reaches into Rhineland-Palatinate)
 VRN Verkehrsverbund Rhein-Neckar (reaches into Baden-Württemberg and Rhineland-Palatinate)

Lower Saxony
 HVV Hamburger Verkehrsverbund (reaches into Hamburg and Schleswig-Holstein)
 GVH Großraum-Verkehr Hannover
 VBN Verkehrsverbund Bremen-Niedersachsen (reaches into Bremen)
 VEJ Verkehrsverbund Ems-Jade Home page
 VRB Verbundtarif Region Braunschweig
 VSN Verkehrsverbund Süd-Niedersachsen Home page

Mecklenburg-Western Pomerania
 LTV Ludwigsluster Tarifverbund 
 VVW Verkehrsverbund Warnow
 VVW Verkehrsverbund Westmecklenburg

North Rhine-Westphalia
 Statewide (travel between transport associations): NRW-Tarif
 VRR Verkehrsverbund Rhein-Ruhr 
 VRS Verkehrsverbund Rhein-Sieg Home page
 AVV Aachener Verkehrsverbund
 VRL Verkehrsgemeinschaft Ruhr-Lippe / ZRL Zweckverband SPNV Ruhr-Lippe
 VGM Verkehrsgemeinschaft Münsterland / ZVM Zweckverband SPNV Münsterland
 VVOWL Verkehrsverbund OstWestfalenLippe (Der Sechser)
 NPH Nahverkehrsverbund Paderborn-Höxter (Hochstift-Tarif)
 VGWS Verkehrsgemeinschaft Westfalen-Süd / ZWS Zweckverband Personennahverkehr Westfalen Süd
 VGN Verkehrsgemeinschaft Niederrhein / NVN Nahverkehrs-Zweckverband Niederrhein

Rhineland-Palatinate
 KVV Karlsruher Verkehrsverbund (reaches into Baden-Württemberg)
 RMV Rhein-Main-Verkehrsverbund (reaches into Hesse)
 RNN Rhein-Nahe-Nahverkehrsverbund (reaches into Hesse)
 VRN Verkehrsverbund Rhein-Neckar (reaches into Baden-Württemberg and Hesse)
 VRM Verkehrsverbund Rhein-Mosel
 VRT Verkehrsverbund Region Trier

Saarland
 saarVV Saarländischer Verkehrsverbund Home page

Saxony
 MDV Mitteldeutscher Verkehrsverbund (reaches into Saxony-Anhalt and Thuringia)
 VMS Verkehrsverbund Mittelsachsen
 VVO Verkehrsverbund Oberelbe
 ZVON Zweckverband Verkehrsverbund Oberlausitz-Niederschlesien
 VVV Verkehrsverbund Vogtland

Saxony-Anhalt
 marego Magdeburger Regionalverkehrsverbund
 MDV Mitteldeutscher Verkehrsverbund (reaches into Saxony and Thuringia)

Schleswig-Holstein
 Schleswig-Holstein-Tarif: Statewide, travel between transport associations
 HVV Hamburger Verkehrsverbund (reaches into Hamburg and Lower Saxony)
 TGL Tarifgemeinschaft Lübeck
 VRK Verkehrsverbund Region Kiel (no own tariffs)

Thuringia
 MDV Mitteldeutscher Verkehrsverbund (reaches into Saxony and Saxony-Anhalt)
 VMT Verkehrsverbund Mittelthüringen

!

Transport